Lechea (pinweed) is a genus in the family Cistaceae of the order Malvales.

The genus Lechea is based primarily in eastern North America and contains about 18 species referred to as "pinweeds." Most are low-growing herbs with narrow leaves and may small flowers that resemble pinheads.

Linnaeus named the genus Lechea for Swedish botanist Johan Leche (1704-1764), who taught in Finland and is regarded as the father of Finnish meteorology and space research, based on his documentation of the northern lights and early measurements of air temperature in collaboration with Anders Celsius.

Species
Species of Lechea include:Lechea cernuaLechea deckertiiLechea divaricataLechea intermediaLechea lakelaeLechea maritimaLechea mensalisLechea minorLechea mucronataLechea pulchellaLechea racemulosaLechea san-sabeanaLechea sessilifloraLechea strictaLechea tenuifoliaLechea torreyiLechea tripetala''

References

Cistaceae
Malvales genera